Maxwell William Strange (March 22, 1820 – September 28, 1880) was an Ontario lawyer and political figure. He represented Kingston in the Legislative Assembly of Ontario from 1867 to 1871 as a Conservative member.

He was born in Kingston in 1820, the son of John Strange who represented Frontenac in the Upper Canada assembly. Served in the Kingston Volunteer Rifles during the Rebellion of 1837. Afterwards lieutenant colonel in the Canadian Militia, commanded the Cavalry-No.3 Military District and then the Cavalry and Rifles in Kingston. Strange was called to the bar in 1845. In 1849, he married Charlotte Anna, the daughter of Dr. James Campbell and sister of Sir Alexander Campbell, Lieutenant-Governor of Ontario, 1887.  In 1854, he ran unsuccessfully in Frontenac for a seat in the legislative assembly for the Province of Canada. He defeated doctor John Stewart for the seat in the provincial assembly in 1867. Strange was also a justice of the peace, a police magistrate and vice-president of the Commercial Bank. Father of seven.

His brother Orlando Sampson was a doctor and served as mayor of Kingston.

External links 
The Canadian parliamentary companion HJ Morgan (1871)

1820 births
1880 deaths
Canadian people of Scottish descent
Progressive Conservative Party of Ontario MPPs
Canadian justices of the peace